Pseudoplanodes is a genus of longhorn beetles of the subfamily Lamiinae, containing the following species:

 Pseudoplanodes aurivilliusi (Schwarzer, 1926)
 Pseudoplanodes mindoroensis Breuning, 1945
 Pseudoplanodes xenoceroides Heller, 1923

References

Mesosini